Chinophrys taiwanensis is a species of jumping spiders.

Description
The species is allied to C. wuae.

Name
The species name is derived from the type locality.

Distribution
C. taiwanensis is endemic to Taiwan.

Literature

  (2002): Four new and two newly recorded species of Taiwanese jumping spiders (Araneae: Salticidae) deposited in the United States. Zoological Studies 41(3): 337-345. PDF

Salticidae
Spiders described in 2002
Spiders of Taiwan
Endemic fauna of Taiwan